Witchgrass may refer to:

Elymus repens, a species of grass native to most of Europe, Asia, the Arctic biome, and northwest Africa
Panicum capillare, a native plant of most of North America